Vlochos is a village in modern Thessaly, Greece. It belongs to the municipality of Palamas in the regional unit of Karditsa.

History
Just south of the village lies the steep hill of Strongilovouni, the site of an extensive ancient settlement. The remains at Strongilovouni are studied by the Ephorate of Antiquities of Karditsa and the Swedish Institute at Athens in an ongoing collaborative project.

External links

References

Populated places in Karditsa (regional unit)